The 1938–39 Cupa României was the sixth edition of Romania's most prestigious football cup competition.

The title was won by Rapid București against Sportul Studențesc București.

Format
The competition is an annual knockout tournament with pairings for each round drawn at random.

There are no seeds for the draw. The draw also determines which teams will play at home. Each tie is played as a single leg.

If a match is drawn after 90 minutes, the game goes in extra time, and if the scored is still tight after 120 minutes, there a replay will be played, usually at the ground of the team who were away for the first game.

From the first edition, the teams from Divizia A entered in competition in sixteen finals, rule which remained till today.

The format is almost similar with the oldest recognised football tournament in the world FA Cup.

First round proper 

|colspan=3 style="background-color:#FFCCCC;"|13 November 1938

|}

Second round proper 

|colspan=3 style="background-color:#FFCCCC;"|19 March 1939

|-
|colspan=3 style="background-color:#FFCCCC;"|11 April 1939

|}

Quarter-finals 

|colspan=3 style="background-color:#FFCCCC;"|2 April 1939

|-
|colspan=3 style="background-color:#FFCCCC;"|19 June 1939

|-
|colspan=3 style="background-color:#FFCCCC;"|24 June 1939

|-
|colspan=3 style="background-color:#FFCCCC;"|25 June 1939

|}

Semi-finals

|colspan=3 style="background-color:#FFCCCC;"|29 June 1939

|-
|colspan=3 style="background-color:#FFCCCC;"|2 July 1939

|}

Final

References

External links
romaniansoccer.ro

Cupa României seasons
1938–39 in Romanian football
1938–39 domestic association football cups